The Surveilling Miniature Attack Cruise Missile (SMACM) is a long range, high endurance, expendable, unmanned aerial vehicle(UAV) under development by Lockheed Martin. It is equipped with a two-way datalink and is designed to reconnoitre a target area and if necessary engage targets with its weapon system.

Specifications
 Weight: 142 lb
 Length: 70.5 in
 Engine: Type J45G turbojet.
 Range: > 
 Seeker:
 "Tri-Mode" - millimeter wave (MMW) RF radar, imaging infrared (IIR), and a semi active laser (SAL) or
 "Tri-Star" - MMW, active LADAR, and SAL.
 Payload: Four Low Cost Autonomous Attack System missiles.

References

External links
 Surveilling Miniature Attack Cruise Missile - Lockheed Martin
 Surveilling Miniature Attack Cruise Missile - Lockheed Martin Missiles and Fire Control
 Surveilling Miniature Attack Cruise Missile (SMACM) - Defense Update

Cruise missiles of the United States